Martin Majnovics (born 26 October 2000) is a Hungarian professional footballer who plays as a defender for Pécs.

Club career
Majnovics started his youth career with hometown club SC Sopron and moved to Austria in 2014 to join SV Mattersburg. By the end of 2016–17 season, he started to play for club's reserve side in Landesliga Burgenland – fourth division of Austrian football league system. He also won back-to-back Landesliga Burgenland titles with the reserve team. He made his professional debut for club's first team on 23 June 2020 in a 1–1 draw against Rheindorf Altach.

Mattersburg went bankrupt after 2019–20 season and Majnovics joined fellow Bundesliga side SKN St. Pölten in October 2020. He signed a contract with the club until June 2022.

On 7 February 2022, Majnovics returned to Austria and joined SV Horn on loan until the end of the season.

On 18 January 2023, Majnovics signed with Pécs.

International career
Majnovics is a former Hungarian youth international. He was part of under-17 team squad which reached quarter-finals of 2017 UEFA European Under-17 Championship.

Career statistics

Club

References

External links
 

2000 births
People from Sopron
Sportspeople from Győr-Moson-Sopron County
Living people
Association football defenders
Hungarian footballers
Hungary youth international footballers
Hungary under-21 international footballers
SV Mattersburg players
SKN St. Pölten players
Zalaegerszegi TE players
SV Horn players
Pécsi MFC players
Austrian Regionalliga players
Austrian Football Bundesliga players
2. Liga (Austria) players
Nemzeti Bajnokság II players
Hungarian expatriate footballers
Expatriate footballers in Austria
Hungarian expatriate sportspeople in Austria